Yenikənd (also, Yenikend) is a village and the most populous municipality, except for the capital Siyəzən, in the Siazan Rayon of Azerbaijan.  It has a population of 2,899.  The municipality consists of the villages of Yenikənd and Kolanı. 

The Long Wall of Apzut Kawat, a 20-kilometer long Sassanid defensive wall, passes through the village.

References 

Populated places in Siyazan District